Michael Lee Swain (born December 21, 1960 in Elizabeth, New Jersey) is one of the most successful American judokas. He competed in countless international competitions.  He is now the VP of Martial Arts at Dollamur,  Sports LP where he develops and sells Martial Arts equipment and continues to be a spokesperson  and board member for USA Judo.

Judo success 
Swain competed in major international tournaments including four Olympics and five World Championships. He is most known for his historic win in 1987, becoming the first male judoka from the United States to win a World Championship since its inception in 1956. He also won silver at both the 1985 and 1989 World Championships, as well as a gold at the 1987 Pan American Games. He is a four-time Olympian*, a five-time World team member and was the 1996 US Olympic Judo coach for the Atlanta Games.

 The US boycotted the 1980 Olympic Games held in Moscow, USSR. Swain was one of 461 athletes to receive a Congressional Gold Medal years later.

Training and coaching 
Throughout his professional judo career, he spent much of his time training in Japan at Nihon University and the Tokyo Police Academy. He also trained internationally in Wimbledon, UK at the Crystal Palace Training Center with Neil Adams, in Kendal, England at the National Judo Training Center, in Seoul, Korea at Yongin University, in Paris, France at INSEP and, in Koln, Germany at the Koln National Judo Training Center. Despite all his travels, Swain continually returned San Jose where he trained under Yoshihiro Uchida, a pioneer for American judo. Swain graduated from San Jose State University in 1985 with a degree in business marketing and continues to this day to coach and bring more students to the program with the Swain Scholarship.

Honors 
Swain has been honored for many of his accomplishments as an American judoka. He was named Black Belt Magazine's  "competitor of the year" in 1985, as well as Instructor of the year in 1994. In 2003 the USOC honored several athletes who were pioneers in their sports. Swain was honored as a pioneer for USA Judo alongside other athletes such as Evander Holyfield for boxing and Dan Gable for wrestling.

Business 
In 1987 he founded Swain Sports. He grew the company to become a successful multimillion-dollar, international business at the heart of the martial arts equipment industry. In 2008 he sold his company to Dollamur and became the VP of the Global Martial Arts Division, where he and the company worked together to develop the next generation Flexi-Roll mat. He is the author of two books Ashiwaza II and Championship Judo, as well as the Co-producer of several martial arts shows like Pro Judo, Pro Tae Kwon Do, and Pro Sumo which all have premiered on ESPN. He is the producer of the DVD series Complete Judo, Basic Judo and Basic Grappling.

Personal 
Swain's wife Tania Chie Ishii represented Brazil in the 1992 Summer Olympic Games, and his father-in-law Chiaki Ishii won the bronze medal for Brazil in the 1972 Summer Olympic Games. They live in San Jose with their daughter, Sophia, and a son, Masato, who have grown up doing judo and other sports.

References

Sources
 Swain, Michael Ashiwaza II Swain's book on ashi-waza, a category of judo throws accomplished with the feet.

External links
 
 Swain Mats
 Mike's page on the Real Judo magazine "Legends of Judo" page
 An interview with Mike Swain

1960 births
American male judoka
San Jose State University alumni
Living people
Sportspeople from Elizabeth, New Jersey
Judoka at the 1984 Summer Olympics
Judoka at the 1988 Summer Olympics
Judoka at the 1992 Summer Olympics
Olympic judoka of the United States
Olympic bronze medalists for the United States in judo
Medalists at the 1988 Summer Olympics
Pan American Games gold medalists for the United States
Pan American Games bronze medalists for the United States
People from Campbell, California
Pan American Games medalists in judo
Universiade medalists in judo
Congressional Gold Medal recipients
Goodwill Games medalists in judo
Judoka at the 1983 Pan American Games
Judoka at the 1987 Pan American Games
Universiade bronze medalists for the United States
Competitors at the 1990 Goodwill Games
Medalists at the 1983 Pan American Games
Medalists at the 1987 Pan American Games